Michel's Patisserie is an Australian chain of bakery-style food outlets purveying cakes, pies, savouries, and espresso coffee. The company is a franchise system that was founded in 1988, and it has over 90 retail outlets in all Australian states and territories, except for Western Australia & Tasmania. The chain employs approximately 4,000 staff and serves approximately 36 million cups of coffee and 9.5 million slices of cake each year. It is the largest pastry chain in Australia. In 2016, Michel's Patisserie Toronto was judged to be National Retail Association Supreme Retailer of the Year.

The Michel's Patisserie franchise network is owned and managed by Retail Food Group (RFG), which also manages Gloria Jeans Coffee, Brumby's Bakeries and Donut King.

History
Michel's Patisserie is a wholly Australian-owned firm, which Noel Carroll and Noel Roberts founded in 1988. Their business model involves a central bakery that bakes products and distributing said products to retail outlets on a daily basis. These retail outlets act as points of sale, from where customers may purchase the products on display. After two years of research into all facets of the concept, distribution, store design and layout, marketing, and training, the model was tested under full market conditions in stores located in Castlecrag and Newport before being launched as a franchise system in 1990. The franchise reportedly won the 2007 Churner of the year award. In February 2006, Michel's Patisserie conducted a management buyout and merged with its master franchisee in Queensland and Victoria to create a single national franchise business.

The original Michel's Patisserie was started in Sydney by French chef, Michel Cattoen and his wife Elisabeth in 1980.

See also

 List of coffeehouse chains
 List of restaurant chains in Australia

References

External links
 

Bakeries of Australia
Bakery cafés
Coffeehouses and cafés in Australia
Companies based in Sydney
Food and drink companies established in 1988
1988 establishments in Australia